Anthidium hallinani is a species of bee in the family Megachilidae, the leaf-cutter, carder, or mason bees.

Distribution
Guatemala
Mexico
Panama

References

hallinani
Insects described in 1933